is a Japanese politician of the Liberal Democratic Party, a member of the House of Representatives in the Diet (national legislature). A native of Fukaya, Saitama and graduate of Kanagawa Dental College, he obtained his medical license in 1984 and became the assistant director at a hospital in Fukaya in 1986. He was elected to the assembly of Saitama Prefecture in 2003 (serving for one term) and then to the House of Representatives for the first time in 2005.

See also 
Koizumi Children

References

External links 
  in Japanese.

Members of the House of Representatives (Japan)
Koizumi Children
Japanese dentists
Politicians from Saitama Prefecture
Living people
1957 births
Liberal Democratic Party (Japan) politicians